The following is a list of concert band works commissioned by or dedicated to Kappa Kappa Psi or Tau Beta Sigma.

In 1947, Kappa Kappa Psi created its first National Intercollegiate Band, a band composed of musicians from universities across the United States. Since 1953, the national chapters of Kappa Kappa Psi and Tau Beta Sigma have commissioned a new work for wind band to be premiered at the National Intercollegiate Band concert. This program was begun under the direction of Grand President Hugh McMillen to add to the wind repertoire. A number of the commissions have garnered national acclaim, including Robert Russell Bennett's Symphonic Songs for Band, commissioned for the 1957 National Intercollegiate Band, and Karel Husa's Concerto for Trumpet and Wind Orchestra, commissioned for the 1973 band.

In the years following the start of the national commissioning program, local chapters have begun to commission new band works themselves. Some of these have also received acclaim, including David Maslanka's Traveler, commissioned by the University of Texas at Arlington chapters of the fraternity and sorority in honor of the retirement of Director of Bands Ray Lichtenwalter.

Between the national Commissioning Program and commissions from individual chapters, many notable band composers have been commissioned, including Jack Stamp, David Gillingham, Julie Giroux, Claude T. Smith, Frank Ticheli and W. Francis McBeth.

List of works

Notes

References 

Lists of musical works

Kappa Kappa Psi
Tau Beta Sigma